was a Japanese era name (年号, nengō, lit. year name) after Ken'ei and before Kenryaku. This period spanned the years from October 1207 through March 1211.

Change of era
 1207 ; 1207: The new era name was created to mark an event or a number of events. The previous era ended and a new one commenced in Ken'ei 2, on the 25th day of the 10th month of 1207.

Events of the Jōgen era
 1208 (Jōgen 2, 6th month): The emperor went to the Kumano Sanzan Shrine.
 1210 (Jōgen 4, 5th month): The emperor returned to the Kumano Shrine.
 1210 (Jōgen 4, 6th month): The emperor accepted Hideyasu, prince of Kazusa, as part of the court.
 1210 (Jōgen 4, 8th month): The emperor visited the Kasuga Shrine.
 1210 (Jōgen 4, 9th month): A comet with a very long tail appeared in the night sky.
 1210 (Jōgen 4, 25th day of the 11th month): In the 12th year of Tsuchimikado-tennōs reign (土御門天皇12年), the emperor abdicated for no particular reason; and the succession (senso) was received by his younger brother, the second son of the former-Emperor Go-Toba. Shortly thereafter, Emperor Juntoku is said to have acceded to the throne (sokui).

Notes

References
 Brown, Delmer and Ichiro Ishida. (1979). The Future and the Past: a translation and study of the 'Gukanshō', an interpretative history of Japan written in 1219.  Berkeley: University of California Press. ;  OCLC 5145872
 Kitagawa, Hiroshi and Bruce T. Tsuchida, eds. (1975). The Tale of the Heike. Tokyo: University of Tokyo Press. 	; ; ; ;  OCLC 193064639
 Nussbaum, Louis-Frédéric and Käthe Roth. (2005).  Japan encyclopedia. Cambridge: Harvard University Press. ;  OCLC 58053128
 Titsingh, Isaac. (1834). Nihon Odai Ichiran; ou,  Annales des empereurs du Japon.  Paris: Royal Asiatic Society, Oriental Translation Fund of Great Britain and Ireland. OCLC 5850691
 Varley, H. Paul. (1980). A Chronicle of Gods and Sovereigns: Jinnō Shōtōki of Kitabatake Chikafusa. New York: Columbia University Press. ;  OCLC 6042764

External links
 National Diet Library, "The Japanese Calendar" -- historical overview plus illustrative images from library's collection

Japanese eras
1200s in Japan
1210s in Japan